Menace II Society (pronounced Menace to Society) is a 1993 American teen drama film directed by the Hughes Brothers in their directorial debut. The film is set in Watts and Crenshaw neighborhoods of Los Angeles, and follows the life of Caine Lawson (Tyrin Turner) and his close friends. It gained notoriety for its scenes of violence, profanity, and drug-related content, and also received critical acclaim for the performances of Turner, Jada Pinkett, and Larenz Tate, the direction, and its realistic portrayal of urban violence and powerful underlying messages.

Plot
Caine Lawson and his best friend Kevin "O-Dog" Anderson enter a liquor store to buy some malt liquor, where a Korean cashier and his wife rush them to pay for their drinks and leave, suspecting that they might be trying to steal something. After their purchase, the cashier insults and provokes O-Dog by saying, "I feel sorry for your mother." Consequently, O-Dog argues with him, fatally shoots both the cashier and his wife, takes the surveillance tape, robs the clerk's wallet and the cash register, and flees with Caine.

In a voice-over, Caine reveals that his father Tat, a drug dealer, was killed in a drug deal gone wrong when Caine was 10, and his mother Karen, a heroin addict, died of a drug overdose. This led to his grandparents raising him in the crime-ridden Jordan Downs housing projects.

O-Dog flaunts the surveillance tape to his admiring friends, greatly annoying Caine. Later, Caine and his cousin Harold are carjacked en route from a party, with Caine being wounded and Harold being murdered. After learning the carjackers' whereabouts, Caine, O-Dog, and their friend A-Wax, an OG, hunt them down and kill them, avenging Harold's death.

Caine and O-Dog attempted to steal a car then got caught and bitten by a police dog. The two men get arrested after a failed car theft attempt. Caine's fingerprints match those taken from a beer bottle he dropped in the liquor store on the night of the murders, and though he is interrogated by a detective who tricks him by changing the times to confuse him, he soon walks free nonetheless as the police fail to link him. Caine's friends, Stacy and Sharif, try to convince him to accompany them to Kansas, and both his grandfather and Sharif's father warn him that he will either end up dead or imprisoned unless he changes his ways. Caine, nevertheless, ignores all advice.

After buying a Ford Mustang from a chop shop, Caine carjacks another young black man for his gold Dayton wire wheels and his jewelry, subsequently orders some double cheeseburgers at the fast food restaurant, then purchases a large quantity of cocaine, planning to sell it as crack. Caine also meets a local girl named Illena and eventually has sex with her. While driving one night, he and Sharif are pulled over and beaten by cops. The two are dumped in a Hispanic neighborhood, but the Hispanic gang members surprisingly take them to a hospital rather than beat them further as feared. During his hospitalization, Caine's friend Ronnie invites him to accompany her to Atlanta, where she has found a job. Initially hesitant, he ultimately agrees.

At a party, Chauncey, a confederate of Caine in an insurance scam, drunkenly moves sexually towards Ronnie. Caine rescues her and starts pistol-whipping Chauncey, prompting Stacy and Sharif to restrain him. Illena calls Caine and tells him she's pregnant, but he denies paternity and drops her. Chauncey retaliates by sending a copy of the surveillance tape to the police, who begin hunting Caine and O-Dog, now wanted for the liquor store crimes. Doc, Caine & O-Dog's friend, alerts O-Dog and others of Chauncey's actions, forcing O-Dog and Caine to hide out at Ronnie's and other friends' houses. O-Dog vows to murder Chauncey if the police don't catch him first.

Meanwhile, Caine brutally stomps Illena's cousin when he confronts Caine outside his grandparents' house about the pregnancy. After witnessing the stomping, Caine's grandparents decide that it is best for him to not live with them anymore, despite his pleas to stay until he moves to Atlanta. Meanwhile, Illena's cousin gathers his friends to get revenge on Caine.

As Caine and Ronnie are preparing to leave for Atlanta, Illena's cousin and his friends drive by Ronnie's house and engage in a drive-by shootout. Sharif is killed instantly, while Caine is fatally wounded trying to protect Ronnie's son, Anthony. Stacy and Ronnie come running out of the house screaming for help. O-Dog retaliates at the attackers and is unharmed and Stacy tells him to get help. As Caine slowly dies, he recalls his grandfather asking him if he cares whether he lives or dies, and he realizes in his dying moment that he does.

Cast
Tyrin Turner as Caine Lawson
Brandon Hammond as five-year-old Caine
Jada Pinkett as Ronnie
Larenz Tate as Kevin "O-Dog" Anderson
MC Eiht as A-Wax
Glenn Plummer as James "Pernell" Richards
Clifton Powell as Chauncey
Arnold Johnson as Thomas Lawson
Pooh-Man as Doc
Julian Roy Doster as Anthony
Too Short as Lew-Loc
Khandi Alexander as Karen Lawson
Vonte Sweet as Sharif Butler
Bill Duke as Detective
Samuel L. Jackson as Tat Lawson
Charles S. Dutton as Mr. Butler
Saafir as Harold Lawson
Ryan Williams as Stacy
Reginald Ballard as Clyde

Production

Originally, rapper MC Ren was set to play A-Wax, but later turned down the role when he joined the Nation of Islam in late 1992. MC Eiht replaced MC Ren's role as A-Wax. Rappers Spice 1 and Tupac Shakur were initially set to play Caine and Sharif respectively, but they were later fired, with director Allen Hughes stating that Shakur was causing trouble on the set. Shakur was angry for not being told why Sharif would turn Muslim. When Shakur was cast in the role of Sharif who, as described in the film was “an ex-knucklehead turned Muslim”, he did not agree with how the character was written. While many of his rap music contemporaries were portraying roles similar to their gangsta rap personas, Sharif would have required Shakur to portray the character as a stoic & pious Muslim. According to MC Eiht, who played A-Wax in the film:

“My take on it was, everytime we got ready to reherse, he had an opinion about his character…He wanted them to write in the script WHY he turned Muslim…”

“Show me why I turned Muslim and they wouldn’t do it and that’s what angered him…”

“You’re not just going to give people that ideal that Tupac is just this yeah you know, “preach my brother”, fuck that!” 

Six months after the firing, Shakur assaulted Hughes, resulting in Shakur being found guilty of assault and battery. Nonetheless, after Tupac's death, Allen Hughes praised the actor, stating “If ‘Pac had been in the movie he would’ve outshined everyone.”

Reception 
Menace II Society received generally  positive reviews from critics. The film has an 84% approval score on Rotten Tomatoes based on 43 reviews, with an average rating of 7.40/10. The consensus reads, "Told with grit and verve by the Hughes brothers in their feature debut, Menace II Society is a gangland epic that breathes with authenticity while steeped in style."

Chicago Reader critic Jonathan Rosenbaum stated, "This is a powerful, convincing, and terrifying look at teenage crime in contemporary Watts." Owen Gleiberman from Entertainment Weekly gave it a positive review, stating, "Menace II Society is bleak, brilliant, and unsparing."

Emanuel Levy gave the film an A, saying it is "The most stunning feature debut in the new African American cinema, even more so than Boyz n the Hood to which the coming of age feature bears thematic resemblance." The film was placed on both Gene Siskel and Roger Ebert's 10 best films of 1993 lists, with Ebert praising "the way the filmmakers tell Caine's story without making him seem either the hero or victim".

However, the film has also received some negative reviews. Geoff Andrew of Time Out stated, "Regrettably, the Hughes Brothers' first feature is a compendium of clichés." Stephen Holden of The New York Times stated, "If Menace II Society is terrific on ambiance, it is considerably less successful in revealing character." At the 1994 MTV Movie Awards, the film was awarded Best Movie, beating out the likes of Philadelphia, Jurassic Park and Schindler's List. The film also won an Independent Spirit Award for Best Cinematography and was nominated for Best First Feature, but lost to El Mariachi (the first installment in the Robert Rodriguez's Mexico Trilogy).

The film grossed $27.9 million in the United States and Canada but only $1.6 million internationally for a worldwide total of $29.5 million.

Soundtrack

A soundtrack containing hip hop music was released on May 26, 1993, by Jive Records. It peaked at #11 on the Billboard 200 and #1 on the Top R&B/Hip-Hop Albums.

Home media
The director's cut of Menace II Society was released on LaserDisc in 1994 via The Criterion Collection. In August 2021, Criterion announced that Menace II Society, alongside 5 other films, would be released as a part of its first 4K Ultra HD releases. Criterion indicated each title will be available in a 4K UHD+Blu-ray combo pack including a 4K UHD disc of the feature film as well as the film and special features on the companion Blu-ray. The titles were released in November 2021.

Legacy 
In 2013, rapper and record producer Kanye West cited Menace II Society as one of his "most-watched" favorite films on an episode of the Bret Easton Ellis Podcast.

See also
 List of films featuring surveillance
 List of hood films
Boyz n the Hood
Colors
New Jack City
Juice
Deep Cover
Strapped

References

External links

1993 films
1993 crime drama films
1993 directorial debut films
1990s coming-of-age drama films
1990s gang films
1990s teen drama films
1993 independent films
American independent films
American coming-of-age drama films
American crime drama films
American gang films
American teen drama films
African-American–Asian-American relations
Asian-American drama films
African-American drama films
African-American films
Bloods
Crips
Films about death
Films about drugs
Films directed by the Hughes brothers
Films set in Koreatown, Los Angeles
Films set in Los Angeles
Hood films
New Line Cinema films
1990s English-language films
1990s American films